Vanne may refer to:

 Vanne, Haute-Saône, Bourgogne-Franche-Comté, France; a commune
 Vanne (river), France; a river
 Pont-sur-Vanne (Vanne Bridge), Pont-sur-Vanne, Yonne, Bourgogne-Franche-Comté, France; a bridge in the eponymous commune
 Les Vallées-de-la-Vanne (Vanne Valleys), Yonne, Bourgogne-Franche-Comté, France; a commune
 Marda Vanne (1896–1970) South African actress
 Congregation of St. Vanne, a Benedictine reform movement

See also

 
 Vannes (disambiguation)
 Venne (disambiguation)
 Van de Venne (disambiguation)
 Vann (disambiguation)
 Vane (disambiguation)
 Van (disambiguation)